Drafthouse Films is a film distribution company based in Austin, Texas which releases "provocative, visionary and artfully unusual films new and old from around the world". It was founded in 2010 by Tim League, who had previously founded the Alamo Drafthouse Cinema chain. Drafthouse Films has released a variety of films since its inception.

Its third release, Bullhead, was nominated for an Academy Award for Best Foreign Language Film. Its fourteenth release, The Act of Killing, was nominated for an Academy Award for Best Documentary Feature, as was its sequel The Look of Silence.

In March 2022, it was announced that digital distributor Giant Pictures has acquired the Drafthouse Films label. Nick Savva became the new Drafthouse Films CEO, while Alamo Drafthouse founder Tim League serves as chairman of the acquired company. Drafthouse Films' first two acquisitions under new management are Nr. 10, directed by Alex van Warmerdam, and Masking Threshold, a psychological horror pic from director Johannes Grenzfurthner.

Releases

Four Lions (2010)
Comin' at Ya! (1981, re-released in 2012)
The FP (2012)
Bullhead (2012)
Klown (2012)
Trailer War (2012)
The Ambassador (2012)
Miami Connection (1987, re-released in 2012)
Wake in Fright (1971, re-released in 2012)
The ABCs of Death (2013)
Wrong (2013)
Graceland (2013)
Pietà (2013)
A Band Called Death (2013)
I Declare War (2013)
The Act of Killing (2013)
The Visitor (1979, re-released in 2013)
Ms. 45 (1981, re-released in 2013)
A Field in England (2014)
Cheap Thrills (2014)
The Final Member (2014)
Borgman (2014)
Nothing Bad Can Happen (2014)
Mood Indigo (2014)
The Dog (2014)
The Congress (2014)
20,000 Days on Earth (2014)
Fishing Without Nets (2014)
The Overnighters (2014)
Why Don't You Play in Hell? (2014)
R100 (2014)
Amira & Sam (2015)
ABCs of Death 2 (2015)
Spring (2015)
The Connection (2015)
The Keeping Room (2015)
Dangerous Men (2005, re-released in 2015)
The World of Kanako (2015)
The Look of Silence (2015)
The Tribe (2015)
The Invitation (2015)
Roar (1981, re-released in 2015)
Klown Forever (2015)
Raiders!: The Story of the Greatest Fan Film Ever Made (2016)
Men & Chicken (2015)
The Greasy Strangler (2016)
We Are X (2016)
ABCs of Death 2.5 (2016)
Jallikattu (2021)
Nr. 10 (2021)
Masking Threshold (2021)

See also
 Neon
 List of companies based in Austin, Texas

References

External links
Official website

2010 establishments in Texas
Companies based in Austin, Texas
Mass media companies established in 2010
Film distributors of the United States